Renato Cuellar (1927-2001) was a member of the Texas House of Representatives from 1987 until 1997.

Sources
Texas Legislature Reference Library

1927 births
Members of the Texas House of Representatives
Hispanic and Latino American state legislators in Texas
2001 deaths
20th-century American politicians